Qingliangshan Park, is a  park located in the Gulou District, Nanjing, China.

History

Chinese Zen Master Fayan Wenyi (885–958), and founder of the Fayan school, taught at the Qingliang Temple. Juefan Huihong, also known as Qingliang (died 1128 AD), a great and well-known Zen Buddhist teacher in China, came to live at the Qingliang Temple. Tiantong Rujing (1163-1228), a noted Zen master, was an abbot at the temple.

During the Nan Tang dynasty, the area was an imperial summer resort. About 1500 AD, it was the Chongzheng Shuyuan academy. About that time temple was built for a Buddhist monastery name Qingliang Si was established for which the park is best known.

Description
With many trees, it is sometimes called an "urban forest". The entrance of the park has three arch gates; The words “Qingliangshan” on the middle gate were written by Gong Xian. The main attractions are Qing Liang Temple, Chong Zheng College, and the Cui Wei Park.

The City of Nanjing has identified it as one of the top five parks in the city. Others are Mochou Lake Park, Xuanwu Lake, Wuchaomen Park and China Gate Castle Park.

Transportation
The park is accessible within walking distance north west of Hanzhongmen Station of Nanjing Metro.

See also
 Stone City, adjacent to Qingliangshan Park

References

Buildings and structures in Nanjing
Parks in Nanjing